Fernleigh Castle is a historic house in the Sydney suburb of Rose Bay, New South Wales, Australia. Completed in the Victorian architectural style, the house is listed on the (now defunct) Australian Register of the National Estate and the Woollahra local government heritage database.

History and description

Fernleigh Castle was built in 1892 on the site of a sandstone cottage built in 1874, and incorporates the original walls of that building. Castle-like in appearance, it is constructed of sandstone and features a square Norman-style tower, smaller towers with their own turrets, and castellated walls. Although it also includes wrought iron balconies similar to homes in Paddington. The house has thirty rooms and a number of stained-glass windows.

Heritage listing

One of the very few large Victorian mansions still intact in Sydney. A product of the 1890's boom, the structure is a highly decorated example of the stonemason's craft using pink to brown fine dressed sandstone, still in very good condition. The interiors of the main rooms are very decorative contained elaborate plaster ornamentation to walls, piers and archways. Much original cedar joinery remaining and fine crafts example in the main stair. Other notable items include large tiled fireplaces framed by finely carved mahogany mantels with marble pillars supports, intricate stained glass windows, large bedroom (35ft by 18ft) three feet deep porcelain bath in cedar and marble frame, figured of white zinc.

See also
Site of Ficus superba var. henneana tree

References

Houses in Sydney
Gothic Revival architecture in Sydney
Rose Bay, New South Wales
1892 establishments in Australia
Houses completed in 1892
New South Wales places listed on the defunct Register of the National Estate
Sandstone houses in Australia
Victorian architecture in Sydney
New South Wales Heritage Database